Shaun Elliot Jeffers (born 14 April 1992) is an English professional footballer who currently plays as a forward for National League South club St Albans City.

Club career

Coventry City
Jeffers made his professional debut, for Coventry City, on 12 August 2009, in a 1–0 Football League Cup defeat to Hartlepool United. He went on to make his Football League Championship debut three days later as a substitute in a 2–0 win against Barnsley. At the end of the 2009–10 season, Jeffers signed a new deal with the club.

Then, at the end of the 2010–11 season, Jeffers was offered a new deal for another year, which he signed a two-year deal on 20 June 2011.

Shaun was released from the club on 15 May 2013.

Loan spells
On 6 August 2010, Jeffers moved on loan to Football League Two side Cheltenham Town to gain first team experience, the move was an initial one-month deal, which could be extended further. He made his debut for in the opening game of the season, on 7 August 2010, against Gillingham coming on a substitute. His first professional goal came in a 6–4 reverse at Rotherham United, less than two minutes after Jeffers had entered the pitch as a substitute.

After making four appearances and scoring once, Jeffers had his loan with Cheltenham Town extended until 1 January. Later in his Cheltenham Town career, Jeffers had mostly make appearance by coming on as a substitute in the second half and by January, Jeffers loan spell with the club extended. A few weeks later, Jeffers returned to the Coventry City on 31 January 2011.

On 17 February 2011, Jeffers joined Cambridge United on loan for twenty eight days. He made his debut on 18 February 2010, against Kidderminster Harriers coming on a substitute. Jeffers returned to Coventry City on 21 March 2011. He was recalled so caretaker manager Andy Thorn could assess Jeffers along with the whole squad during a two-week international break.

On the last day of the summer transfer window, Jeffers signed for Tamworth on a one-month loan deal. Having not earning games, Jeffers returned to his parent club.

Peterborough United
In July 2013, it was reported that Jeffers went on trial at Tranmere Rovers and had played several matches for Tranmere as a trialist. His performance there was successful and he was offered a contract. However, Jeffers rejected a contract offer from Tranmere due to not being offered accommodation as part of the deal, much to Tranmere manager Ronnie Moore's surprise. Jeffers signed for League One side Peterborough United on 16 October 2013. He made his debut three days later, replacing Britt Assombalonga in the 88th minute of a 1–0 win against Shrewsbury Town. He scored his first goals for the club on 7 December, scoring twice in a 5–0 win against Tranmere Rovers in the FA Cup. On 26 December, he scored against former club Coventry in a 4–2 defeat.

Newport County
On 28 January 2014 Jeffers joined Newport County as part of the deal that took Conor Washington to Peterborough United. He made his debut for Newport County on 15 February 2014 versus Hartlepool. In September 2014 he joined Brackley Town on loan. Jeffers scored his first football league goal for Newport County in the 3–2 win against Carlisle United on 29 November 2014. He was released by Newport in May 2015 at the end of his contract.

Yeovil Town
On 23 June 2015, Jeffers signed for League Two side Yeovil Town on a one-year contract after his release from Newport County.

On 2 February 2016, Jeffers joined National League side Woking on a 28-day loan. On 6 February 2016, Jeffers made his Woking debut featuring in a 1–0 victory over Oxford City in the FA Trophy, before being replaced by Matt Robinson with 13 minutes remaining.

He was released by Yeovil at the end of the 2015–16 season.

Non-league
On 3 August 2016, Jeffers signed for National League South side Chelmsford City. Jeffers went on to score his first goal against Margate with an impressive bicycle kick also going on to win the 'Man Of The Match' award. On 29 October 2016, Jeffers picked up his tenth goal of the campaign when scoring a penalty against Concord Rangers. Over the course of the season, he earned several Man of the Match awards and scored 21 goals, making him one of the highest-scoring players in the division. His contribution helped Chelmsford reach the play-off final for promotion to National League, where they lost to Ebbsfleet United.

After a successful season which saw him score 21 goals, Jeffers signed for National League side Boreham Wood in July 2017. Following a loan spell at Hampton & Richmond Borough in 2018, Jeffers signed for National League North club Brackley Town, scoring once in 12 league appearances for the club. On 28 May 2019, Chelmsford announced the signing of Jeffers, marking his second spell at the club. On 16 June 2020, Chelmsford announced the departure of Jeffers for the second time.

Following his release from Chelmsford, Jeffers joined St Albans City in July 2020. Jeffers had an electric start to the 2021–22 season and after scoring six goals in the month of October, Jeffers was awarded the league's Player of the Month award. On 7 November 2021, Jeffers scored the winner as St Albans City beat League Two leaders Forest Green Rovers in the FA Cup First Round.

Career statistics

References

External links

1992 births
Living people
Sportspeople from Bedford
English footballers
England youth international footballers
Association football forwards
Coventry City F.C. players
Cheltenham Town F.C. players
Cambridge United F.C. players
Tamworth F.C. players
Newport County A.F.C. players
Brackley Town F.C. players
Yeovil Town F.C. players
Woking F.C. players
Chelmsford City F.C. players
Boreham Wood F.C. players
Hampton & Richmond Borough F.C. players
English Football League players
National League (English football) players
Black British sportspeople
Peterborough United F.C. players
St Albans City F.C. players
Footballers from Bedfordshire